Cerdodon tenuidens is an extinct genus of gorgonopsian therapsids. However, some consider this genus to be a nomen dubium. The holotype skull is of a crushed skull of a small therocephalian.

See also
 List of therapsids

References 

 The main groups of non-mammalian synapsids at Mikko's Phylogeny Archive

Gorgonopsia
Prehistoric therapsid genera
Fossil taxa described in 1915
Taxa named by Robert Broom